The women's 5 kilometre classical at the 2007 Asian Winter Games was held on January 31, 2007, at Beida Lake Skiing Resort, China.

Schedule
All times are China Standard Time (UTC+08:00)

Results
Legend
DNS — Did not start

References

Results FIS

External links
Results of the Fifth Winter Asian Games

Women's 5